Srećko or Srečko is a South Slavic masculine given name. It is a Slavic form of Felix. The name may refer to:

Srećko Bogdan
Srečko Brodar
Srećko Horvat
Srećko Ilić
Srećko Juričić
Srečko Katanec, Slovenian
Srečko Kosovel, Slovenian
Srećko Lisinac
Srećko Mitrović, Australian
Srećko Pejović
Srećko Puntarić
Srećko Štiglić

See also
Srećković

Slavic masculine given names
Bosnian masculine given names
Croatian masculine given names
Serbian masculine given names